The John N. Bensen House is a historic house in St. Cloud, Minnesota, United States.  It was built in 1904 for John N. Bensen (1850–1917), a German immigrant who settled in St. Cloud in 1872, found success in the grocery business, and went on to serve as mayor and bank president.  The Bensen House was listed on the National Register of Historic Places in 1982 for its local significance in the themes of architecture and commerce.  It was nominated for being one of St. Cloud's finest examples of Queen Anne architecture and for its association with Bensen.

The house now operates as the Heritage House Bed & Breakfast.

See also
 National Register of Historic Places listings in Stearns County, Minnesota

References

External links

 Heritage House Bed & Breakfast

1904 establishments in Minnesota
Bed and breakfasts in Minnesota
Buildings and structures in St. Cloud, Minnesota
Houses completed in 1904
Houses in Stearns County, Minnesota
Houses on the National Register of Historic Places in Minnesota
National Register of Historic Places in Stearns County, Minnesota
Queen Anne architecture in Minnesota